William Fish may refer to:

William Fish (Scarborough MP) (fl. 1580s), MP for Scarborough
William Fish (musician) (1775–1866), English violinist, organist and composer
William H. Fish (1849–1926), Associate Justice and Chief Justice of the Supreme Court of Georgia
William Fish (South African politician) (fl. 1920s), Mayor of Cape Town
Will Fish (born 2003), English footballer
Billy Fish, fictional character in the 1975 film, The Man Who Would Be King

See also 
 William Fisher (disambiguation)
 William Fitch (disambiguation)